The Steamtown Heritage Rail Centre ("Centre") is a static railway museum based in the former railway workshops located in Peterborough, South Australia.
 
Peterborough was the administrative and service centre for the Peterborough Division of the South Australian Railways, employing up to 1,500 people in the workshops during its heyday. The railway workshops covered an extensive area mainly to the west of the township, and it is in these original buildings that the exhibits are displayed.

The turntable and roundhouse are the main features of the exhibit.

The turntable is unusual in that it accommodates three rail gauges: Narrow gauge, standard gauge and broad gauge. In Australia there were only two similar turntables (located at Port Pirie and Gladstone); all three were on the same line, with the one at Peterborough the only one remaining. This unique situation arose from the standardisation project of the late 1960s. At this time the broad gauge line was extended from Terowie to Peterborough and the Port Pirie to Broken Hill section (passing through Peterborough) was replaced by standard gauge line. The Peterborough to Quorn section remained narrow gauge.

History

Prior to  the cessation of railway operations by Steamtown Peterborough Railway Preservation Society in June 2002, a steering committee, made up of the Federation of North East Councils, the Northern Regional Development Board, and the Flinders Ranges Area Consultative Committee, as well as Society representatives, was established. This led to a project to formalise development of the workshops precinct, which in turn led to the development of the Steamtown Heritage Rail Centre.

Development 

Considerable effort was put into improving the grounds and the presentation of the displays, including interpretive signage.
 
It was hoped that Garratt 402 could return from the Zig Zag Railway in Lithgow; however, negotiations were discontinued. Garratt 402 was the only member of its class which travelled the entire Quorn Line. 

 
A reception centre, which includes offices, a souvenir shop and a cafe, was built just off Main Street, at the north-eastern corner of the 1960s-vintage diesel workshop.

Opening

The Steamtown Heritage Rail Centre was officially opened on 29 November 2009 to much fanfare from the South Australian premier, Mike Rann.

Services 

The centre is open seven days a week; an entry fee is charged.
 
Guided tours, lasting about an hour and a half, provide a narrative of the equipment displayed, the infrastructure on site and its social history as well as exploring amusing railway anecdotes and experiences.

After the centre's opening, technical difficulties limited the availability of the planned sound and light show; but after considerable work to resolve the issues the show is now considered a huge success, operating most nights, dependent only on bookings. The sound and light show has contributed to an increase in the number of overnight stays in the town, which benefits the other tourist attractions and the town in general.

The centre had accreditation as a rail-transport operator to run its motor inspection car, MIC 127, between the centre and the former goods platform in Peterborough yard, though this is rarely done.

Operation 

Today the centre is operated by a staff of volunteers sourced from the local community in conjunction with a paid manager and a receptionist.

Through a skills-development program run in association with the local high school, students assisted with the refurbishment of a sheep wagon and a miniature train. One of these students, Ben Graefe, who also runs tours at the centre, won a Rotary Pride in Workmanship 2010 Award for his efforts.

The centre was planned to be cost neutral to the Council within 7 years, however attendances to both tours and its Sound and Light show have been such that it as expected to break even within two to three years. It was expecting to achieve a visitation rate of 15000 by the end of the 2011-2012 financial year

Awards
October 2010 the Centre won an Advantage SA award, in the Regional Tourism category for Yorke and Mid North Region
During October 2012, the Centre won an Advantage SA award, in the Regional Tourism category
2014 Steamtown won the SA Regional Award for Tourism
2015 Steamtown won the Hall of Fame Award for Tourism in the region of Yorke and Mid North

See also 
 List of Australian heritage railways
 Rail gauge in Australia

References

Further reading 
 McNicol, S.; Mannion, J. (2006). Peterborough 125: Celebrating 125 years of Railways in Peterborough Elizabeth, SA: Railmac Publications. 
 Evans, J. (2009). Proceed to Quorn: An Operational History of the Last Years of the Terowie–Peterborough–Quorn Railway Line, in Particular the Years 1957 to 1987. Elizabeth, SA: Railmac Publications.

External links
 Steamtown Heritage Rail Centre official site
 Steamtown Heritage Rail Centre at the Peterborough, South Australia, website
 Museums in South Australia

Railway museums in South Australia
Heritage railways in Australia
Railway roundhouses in Australia